Ignacia is a given name, the feminine version of Ignacio. It may refer to:

 Ignacia del Espíritu Santo or Mother Ignacia (1663–1748), Filipino Roman Catholic Religious Sister, declared Venerable by Pope Benedict XVI in 2007 
 Ignacia Allamand (born 1981), Chilean film and television actress
 Ignacia Cabrera (born 1987), Chilean retired volleyball player
 Ignacia Jasso (born 1920), Mexican drug dealer, founder of one of the first drug cartels in northern Mexico
 Ignacia Reachy (1816–1866), Mexican female soldier who fought the French during the War of Intervention
 Ignacia Zeballos Taborga (1831–1904), Bolivian seamstress and grocer who enlisted in the army, famed for caring for the wounded

See also
 Santa Ignacia, Tarlac, Philippines, a 2nd-class municipality

Spanish feminine given names